The Sternberg Astronomical Institute (Государственный астрономический институт имени Штернберга in Russian), also known as GAISh (ГАИШ), is a research institution in Moscow, Russia, a division of Moscow State University. The institute is named after astronomer Pavel Karlovich Shternberg. It was founded in 1931, on the site of the observatory established by the university in 1831.

The main-belt asteroid 14789 GAISH, discovered by Lyudmila Chernykh at the Crimean Astrophysical Observatory in 1969, was named in its honour. The official naming citation was published on 6 January 2007.

References

External links
 Sternberg Astronomical Institute

Research institutes in Russia
Moscow State University
Astronomy institutes and departments
Research institutes in the Soviet Union
Astronomy in the Soviet Union
Research institutes established in 1931
1931 establishments in the Soviet Union